Six Flags Great Adventure is an amusement park located approximately 20 miles southeast of Trenton in Jackson, New Jersey. Owned and operated by Six Flags, the park complex is situated between New York City and Philadelphia and includes a water park named Hurricane Harbor. It first opened to the public as simply Great Adventure in 1974 under the direction of restaurateur Warner LeRoy. Six Flags acquired the park in 1977.

In 2012, Six Flags combined its  Great Adventure with its  Wild Safari animal park to form Six Flags Great Adventure & Safari park. At , it is the second-largest theme park in the world following Disney's Animal Kingdom. The park is located right off of Interstate 195 and is along Monmouth Road (County Route 537).

History

Warner LeRoy era (1974–1977)
In 1972, entrepreneurial businessman Warner LeRoy developed concept plans for the Great Adventure entertainment complex, proposing seven parks be built within the complex: An amusement park, a safari park, a show park, a floral park, a sports complex, a shopping district, and a campground with beach/waterpark and stables. His proposal also included plans for hotels, which were connected to the parks and could be reached by boats, buses, a sky ride and/or a monorail. LeRoy wanted his parks to flow naturally through the forest and lakes, capitalizing on the back-to-nature movement of the era. He chose a property then owned by the Switlik family, in an area centrally located between the New York City and Philadelphia regions. The property on County Route 537 had easy access to the newly constructed Interstate 195, which connected central New Jersey to the New Jersey Turnpike (Interstate 95) and would eventually (in 1981) connect to the Garden State Parkway.

Since the park's opening, it has been served by in-house emergency services composing of the Fire Department (Ocean County Station 58) and Emergency Medical Service (Ocean County Squad 80).

LeRoy collaborated with Hardwicke Industries, who previously built safari parks in Canada and Europe. Together, they set out to open the seven parks in stages over a 5-year period. After a 4,500 invitation-only guest opening on June 30, 1974, the Great Adventure entertainment complex opened to the general public on July 1, 1974, at a price tag of $10 million. At the time of the opening, only the Enchanted Forest and Safari parks were operational, with elements from five of the other planned parks being used to create the Enchanted Forest.

The Enchanted Forest was designed and built to look bigger-than-life. A Big Balloon was a tethered hot-air balloon that loomed over the park's entrance and was the biggest of its kind in the world. The Log Flume was the longest log ride constructed in the world at that time and it was accompanied by a giant "Conestoga Wagon", an over-sized log cabin restaurant called "Best of the West" and a huge Western Fortress, in the park's Rootin' Tootin' Rip Roarin' section. The Giant Wheel (now Big Wheel), then the tallest Ferris wheel in the world, and the Freedom Fountain, then the largest spraying fountain in the world, were located on the opposite end of the park. One of the few smaller-than-real life attractions was an outdoor walk-through attraction called the Garden of Marvels. It used working G-scale (o-g scale) LGB trains and boats among models of American landmarks and 1/25-scale recreations of European castles.

This miniature village was an idea taken from LeRoy's proposed Over the Rainbow floral park. A tree filled with snakes, a carousel, antique cars, koi pond, children's playground (called Kiddie Kingdom), petting zoo (named Happy Feeling) and a restaurant named Gingerbread Fancy (now Granny's Country Kitchen) were also borrowed from the floral park concept to create a section of The Enchanted Forest. This section created the park's main midway named Dream Street.

Shoppe Lane was named after a proposed "shopping extravaganza" park, which LeRoy had designed for the property. It lent its large open squares, huge fountain (Main Street Fountain), street performers (clowns and stilt walkers) and shops to the Enchanted Forest. Fairy Tales was the name of a shop that opened with the park in one of the park's over-sized bazaar tents. It sold stuffed animals and toys, including Superman. Other influences from LeRoy's proposal would surface in the years to come.

Neptune's Kingdom was a concept for a lakeside, aquatic show park. From its design came Aqua Spectacle, the home for dolphin performances and high dive shows. Today, the stadium later known as Fort Independence is demolished. Neptune's Kingdom was designed to run the length from Runaway Train to Northern Star Arena, but most of its influences appear in the park's Lakefront area.

Rootin' Tootin' Ready for shootin' opened with Runaway Mine Train on the grand opening on Independence Day. A small compact coaster named Big Fury opened later in the season. The Sky Ride connected two ends of the park with stations in Rootin' Tootin' Ready for shootin and Dream Street. The double sky ride ran originally at the 1964–'65 New York World's Fair. The Great Train Ride was a small train ride that brought guests through a loop of the woods, rather than to a destination of another gate. A small handful of spin rides were located in the Strawberry Fair section and were as close to any thematic journey as the guests were going to take. The Fantasy Fling is older than the park and is the only survivor of these spin rides in 2008.

The Fun Fair area debuted in 1975 with several new spinning rides, a smaller Ferris wheel, and a Schwarzkopf Jumbo Jet roller coaster. The coaster never opened and was removed at the end of the season. A second flume called the Moon Flume was built by Arrow Dynamics to ease crowds on the Log Flume. It was built on the opposite end of the park and the station turntable is used for the stage of the Wiggles show today. The Fortune Festival was a new game section that was located where the Boardwalk section exists today.

LeRoy's original vision for the amusement park featured many dark rides. Although "Man, Time and Space", "The Keystone Cops" and "(Alice) Down the Wishing Well" (among others) never came to be, the Haunted Castle Across the Moat, which was added a few years later, took its cue from the rooms and monsters of the "Hotel Transylvania".

In the early 1980s, the park's entrance was moved to a new central location, which is still in use today. It was designed with an outer mall called Liberty Court, and its Federal style architecture was influenced by the celebration of the United States bicentennial. An inner mall called Avenue of States was adorned by fifty state flags in the central corridor. Six flags remain on Main Street today. The Enchanted Forest name on the park was changed to the complex's main name of Great Adventure. The Strawberry Fair and Fun Fair names were discontinued and the attractions in these areas became part of the newly named Enchanted Forest section. More spin rides, "yummy yummy" food, shows, games and the Safari became a part of "the greatest day of your life." The park became a major attraction with dozens of rides, shows, and several steel roller coasters. The Big Balloon, Happy Kid Ride, The Gondola, Pretty Monster, and Super Cat were the first attractions to be removed from the park before a new owner would make big changes.

Penn Central / Bally's / Westray Capital era (1977–1992)
In 1977, construction began on a steel looping shuttle coaster called Lightnin' Loops (which was removed in 1992). Late that year, however, the park was purchased by Six Flags. This regional theme park company was owned then by Penn Central, which had large stakes in the Philadelphia and New York City regions. Six Flags added rides found in bigger theme parks such as the wooden coaster called Rolling Thunder in 1979, The Buccaneer (a swinging ship from Intamin), Roaring Rapids (now Congo Rapids, an Intamin River Rapids ride), Parachuter's Perch (now Parachute Training Center: Edwards AFB Jump Tower, an Intamin Parachute ride) and Freefall (later Stuntman's Freefall, an Intamin First Generation Freefall), all before the park's tenth anniversary.

1980 saw very few changes. In 1981, the park added a water ride called Roaring Rapids (now called Congo River Rapids). In 1983, the park added a Freefall Ride and in 1984, the park added a roller coaster called the Sarajevo Bobsleds but closed and removed Lil' Thunder, a kiddie coaster, keeping the coaster count to four.

Eight teenagers, including four students and one graduate of Franklin K. Lane High School, lost their lives in a fire at the Haunted Castle on May 11, 1984, sparking controversy over the safety of such attractions. After the incident, new fire safety laws were passed for amusement park fun houses and dark rides.

1986 saw the addition of a second looping coaster and the park's fifth roller coaster, Ultra Twister, with spiral inline twists. The ride was built next to Rolling Thunder, partially taking away the area's western theme. Another water ride called Splashwater Falls (which became Movietown Water Effect in 1992 and has since been removed) was added in which riders rode in a large boat which was pulled uphill and then down a steep waterfall, soaking riders. The new addition was made since attendance at the park had lowered since the Haunted Castle fire, and the park realized new additions were needed to keep the park alive.

Attendance dropped even further when an accident occurred on the Lightnin' Loops roller coaster in 1987. A teenage girl was thrown from the train because she was seated on the wrong side of the shoulder restraint. After the accident, new safety features were added not only to Great Adventure's roller coasters but also to roller coasters around the world. Once again, Great Adventure set both a bad and later good example for the amusement park world. However, the accident was not good for the park's attendance. Attendance was so low, in fact, that in 1987 rumors began to spread that the park may close in a few years. At the end of that season, the park was slated to get a new multiple looping coaster but by the end of the year, it was decided that Six Flags Great America would get the coaster since Great Adventure was not seen as a good investment. At the end of 1988, the park was about to lose its license to sell food, and attendance was so low park management realized a big new addition was necessary.

In the spring of 1988, it was announced that the park would indeed get a new coaster. Sarajevo Bobsleds was removed to make room for the new coaster, The Great American Scream Machine, which opened in April 1989. This coaster had multiple loops and for a month was the tallest roller coaster in the world and brought the park back to five roller coasters. The Scream Machine was removed in 2010 to make room for the new Green Lantern stand-up coaster.

In 1990, as part of a ride rotation program, a stand up looping roller coaster called Shockwave was added to the park. Shockwave had previously operated at Six Flags Magic Mountain. However, Ultra Twister was removed at the end of 1989 and sent to Six Flags Astroworld for the 1991 season keeping the park's coaster count at five. In 1991, the park added a huge complex of "dry" waterslides. While guests got wet on them, they could ride these with regular clothes or swimsuits. These slides were themed after the rivers of the world. Roaring Rapids, as well as the second flume ride in the park, were incorporated into this complex. Roaring Rapids became Congo Rapids, and The Hydro Flume became Irrawaddy Riptide.

Time Warner era (1990–1997)
In 1990, Time Warner acquired a 19.5% stake in Six Flags, then by the end of 1991 acquired an additional 30.5% giving them 50% ownership of the corporation, with the remaining divided equally by silent partners, The Blackstone Group and Wertheim Schroder. Time Warner used the opportunity to advertise and promote their movies through the Six Flags parks. Time Warner purchased the remaining 50% in 1993, then in 1995 sold 51% of the corporation to Boston Ventures. Time Warner, however continued to manage the parks through 1997.

In 1992, the eastern area or Fun Fair area of the park was re-themed Action Town, and then Movietown in 1993. A Batman stunt show was added and the announcement that a new inverted looping roller coaster called Batman The Ride would be added. Lightnin' Loops opened for the first half of the season but was disassembled at the end of July to begin construction of Batman. That coaster was sold to Premier Parks, which at the time was a different company than Six Flags (but would eventually buy Six Flags). Premier Parks put one of the Lightnin' Loops tracks in Frontier City located in Oklahoma City and it still operates today. Premier Parks put the other Lightnin' Loops track in their park in Largo, Maryland (near Washington, DC), then called Adventure World. That track was renamed the Python, which would be removed in 1999. At the end of 1992, the roller coaster Shockwave was removed as part of the "Ride Rotation Program" of Six Flags. Shockwave would be sent to Six Flags Astroworld and would reopen there in 1994 as Batman The Escape. So by the end of 1992, the park was down to just three coasters.

Batman, designed by Bolliger & Mabillard, opened in the spring of 1993 bringing the coaster count back up to four. In 1994, a motion simulator theatre ride was added. Initially, it was an airplane flying themed attraction but has since been changed to a Halloween theme in the fall over the years. A dinosaur theme and a three-dimensional dinosaur theme was also used for this attraction. For several years, it operated as SpongeBob the ride and then as Fly Me To The Moon. For the 2010 season, the attraction did not run and that building remained vacant for future use.

1995 saw the addition of Viper, a steel spiral looping roller coaster similar to Ultra Twister and in Ultra Twister's old spot, bringing the coaster count to five again. 1996 saw the addition of an indoor themed junior roller coaster called Skull Mountain. In 1997, a multiple looping dual track shuttle coaster called Batman & Robin: The Chiller was built but only opened for a day and encountered more technical difficulties. This coaster ended up not opening again until the spring of 1998. This coaster ran rather rough and was referred to as a "headbanger" as was Viper and to a lesser extent The Scream Machine. The Mine Train and Rolling Thunder were also rough rides by then. Also, many flat rides were removed over the years and the park was showing signs of wear and tear, as well as obsolete attractions.

Premier era (1998–2005)
Premier Parks purchased Six Flags from Time Warner and Boston Ventures on April 1, 1998. The following year, the new management team added a dozen flat rides to the park and declared a "war on lines". The Adventure River complex was retired but the flume ride and the Congo Rapids remained. A kiddie water play area also remained as part of a new kiddie ride area called Looney Tunes Seaport. A junior roller coaster called Blackbeard's Lost Treasure Train (now known as Harley Quinn Crazy Train) as well as a kiddie roller coaster called Road Runner Railway were also added, but the star attraction was a floorless steel multiple looping roller coaster called Medusa.

No changes were made at the park in 2000, but across the property on a separate parking lot, a Waterpark named Hurricane Harbor was built and opened at the end of May. This was also separately gated and charges a separate admission from Great Adventure. The park consists of a dozen waterslides, a kiddie water play area, and a wavepool.

In 2001, the park added another state of the art roller coaster called Nitro. In 2002, Batman & Robin: The Chiller was renovated and new trains without over the shoulder harnesses were added making it a much smoother ride. In 2003, Superman: Ultimate Flight was added. Exact models of this are found at Six Flags Over Georgia and Six Flags Great America. In 2004, new harnesses were added to the Runaway Mine Train and the up-charge attraction erUPtion was added to the Boardwalk.

In 2005, the park added the world's tallest coaster called Kingda Ka and also dismantled Viper. With the addition of Kingda Ka, the season pass holders entrance to the park was closed because Kingda Ka's footprint went right over it. A new children's play area called Balin's Jungleland was also added. In 2006, a wooden twister coaster called El Toro was added in the spot formerly occupied by Viper, along with a new themed area, and another kiddie ride area to replace Bugs Bunny Land which was retired at the end of 2004.

Shapiro era (2006–2010)
At the end of 2005, a proxy battle resulted in two major stockholders assuming control of the Six Flags Board. The Premier Group was ousted in December and the new board appointed Mark Shapiro as CEO. In 2007, the park added Wiggles World and removed Batman & Robin: The Chiller. The rolls were replaced with banked hills to enhance ride performance. However, the ride closed forever on June 28 due to technical problems with the ride. Disassembling occurred that September. In addition, the path leading to Chiller was blocked off and several rides including Freefall, Splashwater Falls/Movietown Water Effect, and a couple other flat rides were removed.

In 2008, in the area occupied by the Movietown Water Effect, a new junior indoor Wild Mouse rollercoaster was added called The Dark Knight. Motion Simulator Ride ended the SpongeBob theming in favor of Fly Me To The Moon. Also Glow in the Park Parade was added to the entertainment lineup.

Medusa was refurbished over the off-season and returned in 2009 as "Bizarro", a new incarnation of the same ride. The whole coaster, station, and surrounding theme elements were all changed and repainted to go with the new theme of the ride. Bizarro comic strips were put up along the queue line, and special effects and audio were added to the actual ride. The refurbishment brought crowds back to a ride that was beginning to lose its original charm and popularity.

Weber/Anderson era (2010–2019)

The theme park's parent Six Flags emerged from a 2008–2010 bankruptcy with Al Weber Jr. as an interim CEO and subsequently by Jim Reid-Anderson in August 2010. The company parent also moved its corporate headquarters from New York City back to Texas, where the company started.

For the 2010 season, the Motion Simulator ride Fly Me To The Moon did not reopen and was not replaced with anything and remained vacant. In April 2010, rumors also began that the Great American Scream Machine would be removed at the end of the season. By mid-June, rumors were that the coaster would be removed on July 1. That date came and went but on July 5, 2010, via Facebook, Six Flags confirmed the rumored removal of the Great American Scream Machine on July 18, 2010. The ride closed late on that date and was demolished immediately after to make room for "a major new attraction in 2011." On September 16, 2010, the park announced that the Green Lantern, a standup roller coaster formerly known as Chang at the recently closed Six Flags Kentucky Kingdom, would debut in the Boardwalk section for the 2011 season. Green Lantern's lift hill and first drop run parallel to the lift hill of Superman Ultimate Flight, which involved the demolition of a rarely used section of the preferred parking area.

In late 2010, Six Flags began the process of removing licensed theming from attractions. They terminated several licenses including their license with The Wiggles. Wiggles' World was renamed and rethemed to Safari Kids in time for the 2011 season. Also in 2011, eruption was removed. Construction for the new Funtime Slingshot replacing eruption started mid-June 2011 and was recently finished a few weeks after.

In 2012, Great Adventure introduced SkyScreamer, a  Funtime StarFlyer, that soars riders in a  circle at speeds over 43 miles per hour (69 km/h), that opened in the spring of 2012, along with bumper cars, flying elephants, and a musical themed scrambler that opened in the newly transformed area Adventure Alley (formerly Fantasy Forest area around the Big Wheel). On February 13, 2012, Six Flags Hurricane Harbor in New Jersey announced a new major water attraction King Cobra, that is the first in the United States. The ride Falls at Hurricane Harbor was proposed to get a transformation, giving it a trapdoor release in 2012, but was later cancelled for the new attraction King Cobra. Furthermore, in 2012, Six Flags Great Adventure removed two of its four Johnny Rockets food stands, one located in Plaza Del Carnival and the other in the Boardwalk. Both were replaced with a new food stand named Totally Kickin' Chicken.

On August 30, 2012, Six Flags combined its  Great Adventure Park with its  Wild Safari animal park to form the  Six Flags Great Adventure & Safari park, the second-largest theme park in the world, after Disney's Animal Kingdom.

A 4th Dimension roller coaster was opened in spring 2016, called The Joker.

In 2017, Six Flags added Justice League: Battle For Metropolis a 4D dark ride.

The ride Cyborg Cyber Spin opened in spring of 2018.

Wonder Woman: Lasso of Truth, a large scale custom Zamperla pendulum ride, was opened in 2019.

During the 2018 off-season, El Diablo was removed from the park and was relocated to La Ronde, where it reopened as Chaos.

In June 2019, the park completed a 23.5 MW solar facility, the largest net-metered solar farm in New Jersey. It produces around 30 million kWh per year, equivalent to most of the park's electricity needs. The facility includes 11 MW of solar canopy over the carpark. The facility was announced in March 2015.

2020–present
On August 29, 2019, Six Flags announced a new coaster, the Jersey Devil Coaster, to be built by Rocky Mountain Construction. Six Flags suspended all operations across all their properties due to the COVID-19 pandemic in March 2020. In mid-May, the park announced that they would reopen the first Six Flags attraction, Safari Off Road Adventure, which reopened on May 30, 2020. Following an announcement by Governor Phil Murphy on June 23, 2020, giving permission for amusement parks to reopen, Six Flags Great Adventure announced a day later that it would reopen on July 3, 2020. However, the Jersey Devil Coaster was delayed until the 2021 season because its construction was halted due to the pandemic.

In July 2021, the park re-introduced the ride's old Road Runner Railway kiddie roller coaster to Lil' Devil Coaster, a ride themed to the Jersey Devil, like the nearby Jersey Devil Coaster.

In 2022, the park announced that Bizarro would be re-themed to Medusa, the ride's original theme.

Concerts
Numerous artists have performed concerts at the park, including Bon Jovi, The Ramones, The Beach Boys, Heart, Kansas, Cheap Trick, Joan Jett, and Alice Cooper.

On September 29, 2012, Great Adventure hosted the FestEvil, a festival hosting contemporary metal and hardcore acts; Falling In Reverse and We Came As Romans coheadlined. It was Great Adventure's first metal show. At the end of the show, Falling In Reverse frontman Ronnie Radke threw three microphone stands into the crowd, injuring two attendees. Radke was arrested after the show, and a spokesperson for Great Adventure announced that the park would no longer host shows with metal bands.

Attractions

Main Street
Main Street serves as the entry gate for Six Flags Great Adventure. It was originally entitled Liberty Court and was built when the entrance to the park was moved from near what is now the Boardwalk area to a more central location. Main Street is themed as an Early-American town, somewhere around the 18th century. Later additions to Main Street have formed it into more of a turn-of-the-century town. In the front is Main Street Fountain, which serves as a central hub for the park.

Fantasy Forest

Fantasy Forest serves as the midway for the park and was originally part of the entrance. Fantasy Forest is designed to make its visitors feel like children, and the section's bright colors and fanciful design give it a magical feel. The Yum Yum Cafe, (Previously "The Great Character Cafe"), which is designed to look like a giant ice cream sundae, is in this area along with the colorful Carousel and Enchanted Teacups. Originally, this section was split into two sections; Dream Street, the east side featuring the Carousel, and Strawberry Fair, the west side featuring the Big Wheel and Fantasy Fling. During Time Warner's acquisition of the park, these two sections of the park were combined into one. In 2012, the east side stayed as Fantasy Forest and the west side was re-themed and transformed to Adventure Alley.

Adventure Alley

Adventure Alley, made up of what used to be the right half of Fantasy Forest, opened in 2012 along with SkyScreamer, a FunTime StarFlyer. The area has a retro theme and features several classic family rides. It was built in a formerly barren area in response to complaints about there being a lack of family rides in the park. SkyScreamer, DejaVu (a Scrambler relocated from the shuttered American Adventures in Georgia), and Air Jumbo (a Flying Elephants ride relocated from Balin's Jungleland in the Golden Kingdom) all opened in May, while Fender Benders, a bumper cars attraction, opened in early July. The area was sponsored by the Broadway show Jersey Boys and as such, features songs from the musical as its soundtrack.

The Pine Barrens
The Pine Barrens opened in the park in 2021. It was called Adventure Seaport from 2011 to 2020. It is made up of a children's area, Jr. Thrillseekers, and a small section of the park formerly part of Movietown. Originally, The Pine Barrens also included Looney Tunes Seaport before it was removed in 2020.

Jr. Thrillseekers
Jr. Thrillseekers was known as Wiggles World from 2007 to 2010. Most of the rides were re-themed from Looney Tunes Seaport, while the section itself replaced an aging part of Looney Tunes Seaport and the outdated Riptide flume ride. The area was renamed and re-themed Safari Kids for 2011 when the parks rights to use the Wiggles brand expired. It was renamed to Jr. Thrillseekers in 2022.

Movietown

This section makes up what used to be the "Fun Fair" and "Action Town" sections of the park. It is themed as a Hollywood back lot, complete with Hollywood style buildings, and movie-themed ride, shops, stalls, and other attractions. Most of the attractions include DC Comics (Batman: The Ride). Over the years, many of the movie props have been removed, and all the flat rides in this section of the park have been moved or dismantled. This left the section with very few rides: the addition of The Dark Knight Coaster meant the removal of the Movietown Water Effect, a themed Splashdown ride. Batman and Robin: The Chiller and Stuntman's Freefall (an Intamin free-fall ride) had already been removed, and the "Axis Chemical" themed amphitheater, while still standing, no longer hosts stunt shows. Nitro was included in Movietown until the 2011 season when it became part of Adventure Seaport(The Pine Barrens). For a time this section of the park was essentially a dead-end, forcing patrons to turn back after the Showcase Theater.
The park reopened a pathway between this ride and the Justice League attraction, and now patrons can loop through Movietown and re-emerge near the fountain and the park's main entrance. Additionally, Wonder Woman: Lasso of Truth debuted in June 2019, located just next to the old Axis Chemical building.

Metropolis
Themed after Metropolis from Superman.
In summer 2016, permits were released for a Justice League: Battle for Metropolis dark ride to be placed where Batman and Robin: The Chiller once stood. The area surrounding Justice League: Battle for Metropolis was rethemed to Metropolis. In 2018, Cyborg Cyber Spin opened in the Metropolis area.

Lakefront
Lakefront, as its name suggests, is found right on the lake in the back of the property. The rides and structures in Lakefront all have a nautical theme. The section also includes an Asian-themed eatery (formerly branded as a Panda Express).

Frontier Adventures
Previously known as "Best of the West" and "Rootin' Tootin' Rip Roarin'", Frontier Adventures is the park's western-themed section. It is home to the Fort and the Best of the West restaurant, as well as some of the park's rides. 

Frontier Adventures is now home to the Safari Off Road Adventure station. It stands on the former location of the Super Teepee and the Conestoga Wagon.

Bugs Bunny National Park

Bugs Bunny National Park opened in 2006 along with El Toro. It has a series of camp-themed rides, all in a rustic area on the lake. Attractions include Bugs Bunny Camp Carousel, Bugs Bunny National Water Park Tower, Bugs Bunny Ranger Pilots, Daffy Duck's Hot Air Balloons, Porky Pig Camp Wagons, and Wile E. Coyote Canyon Blaster.

Plaza del Carnaval

This area was originally part of Frontier Adventures, and was also called "Hernando's Hideaway" for the opening of Rolling Thunder. This section of the park has heavy Spanish influences, including music, lights, and various structures including the station for El Toro. The whole area is very festive and is filled with vibrant colors, stucco buildings, and Spanish tile roofs.

The Golden Kingdom
The Golden Kingdom opened in 2005 with Kingda Ka on what was Bugs Bunny Land, the park's old kiddie-section. This section of the park is themed with many bamboo plants, stone temples, and more. It is also home to three llamas, which are near the entrance to the area on Aldabra Island, formerly home to Aldabra tortoises.

Boardwalk
Previously Fortune Festival, the boardwalk section of Great Adventure has games commonly found on boardwalks, boardwalk restaurants, and many of the park's larger flat rides. This area of the park was also previously themed as Edwards Air Force Base, and many of the theme elements from then still exist now, including "latrines. The section also has a slight boardwalk-influence to its rides.

Former attractions

Annual events

Fright Fest

During the Halloween season, Six Flags Great Adventure is redecorated with spider webs, smoke machines, and other Halloween related decorations. Actors dress up in scary costumes and walk around to frighten guests, as they once did at the Haunted Castle. Fright Fest typically begins at 6:00 PM, as the zombies parade to a stage to kick off "fright by night." The park does not recommend the nighttime activities for children 13 or under. Fright Fest attracts some of the heaviest crowds of the year, and becomes more and more crowded as the date draws closer to Halloween.

One of the most popular attractions at Fright Fest every year is the theatrical production of Dead Man's Party, a live dance show with popular music that draws hundreds of viewers for every showing and has attained an almost cult-like local following.

The seasonal event includes upcharge walk-through haunted attractions. Recurring attractions include The Manor, Fears, Wicked Woods, Blood Shed, Big Top Terror, Cell Block 6, and Aftermath. Areas of the park known as "scare zones" include free-roaming zombies are The Bloody Fountain (Main Street), Demon District (Movietown), CarnEvil (Boardwalk), Lady Of The Lake Cemetery (Lakefront), and Bone Butcher Terror-tory (Frontier Adventures).

Holiday in the Park
During the Christmas season, Six Flags Great Adventure is redecorated with Christmas related decorations. During this season, only the Main Street, Adventure Alley, Fantasy Forest, Boardwalk, The Pine Barrens, Jr.Trill seekers, Metropolis, and Movie Town sections of the park remain open. Just as with Fright Fest, Holiday in the Park attracts some of the heaviest crowds of the year.

Awards
Many of Six Flags Great Adventure's most thrilling roller coasters have placed in Amusement Today annual Golden Ticket Awards. Below is a table with coasters at Great Adventure and their highest ranking in the Golden Ticket Awards.

In 2012, Six Flags Great Adventure, along with the Garden State Film Festival, was awarded the Tourism Achievement Award. Both were presented the award for their contributions to improving the economy of the bi-county area through the use of tourism.

Attendance 
Although Six Flags does not release attendance figures, the Themed Entertainment Association (TEA) and other theme park industry analyst companies estimate attendance numbers for the park.

References
Notes

References

External links

 
 

 
Buildings and structures in Ocean County, New Jersey
Tourist attractions in Ocean County, New Jersey
Amusement parks in New Jersey
Great Adventure
1974 establishments in New Jersey
Jackson Township, New Jersey
Amusement parks opened in 1974